The Ford York engine is an inline  Ford diesel engine used in vehicles including the Ford Transit range of vans between 1972 and 1984.

The Transit was fitted with a 2.4-liter four-cylinder engine, but the engine was also available as a 3.5-liter six-cylinder engine. These were fitted in the Ford "A" series of light commercial vehicles. 

The 4 cylinders engine produced 45.7 kW, and the 6-cylinder had an output of 64.9 kW at 3,600 rpm. 

The torque of the 4-cylinder was 13.7 kg; the 6-cylinder had 19.14 km of torque, both at 2250 rpm. 

Both engines had the same bore and stroke, 93.67mm x 85.58mm. The compression ratio was 22:1, and the timing was belt driven. Pistons were made of aluminum and were tin-plated. (Is this a joke?)

The material of both the block and cylinder head was cast iron. The cylinder head was of the cross-flow type and had interchangeable valve seats, the valves were vertically placed and operated by a camshaft that was low placed in the block.

The cold start of the first generation was with a heating element in the intake manifold, and ether injection operated by the driver. 

the later 4 cylinders had more modern glowplugs as a cold start system.  

the lubrication was provided by a double-rotor pump with a capacity of 65 liters per minute at 2,460 rpm. 

Both the four-and six-cylinder engines were also used as industrial engines.
The front of the crankshaft had a long section with a key to allow a  full-power front PTO 

They were redesigned in 1984 and the front PTO (was discontinued. 
The 2.5 DI (direct-injection) engine was a milestone in reliability, with engines commonly reaching 250,000 miles without overhaul.

York